Udea russispersalis is a moth in the family Crambidae. It was described by Zerny in 1914. It is found in China (Xinjiang).

References

russispersalis
Moths described in 1914